The 1970–71 Yorkshire Football League was the 45th season in the history of the Yorkshire Football League, a football competition in England. This season the league expanded up to three divisions.

Division One

Division One featured 12 clubs which competed in the previous season, along with two new clubs:
Barton Town, transferred from the Midland League
Winterton Rangers, joined from the Lincolnshire Football League

League table

Map

Division Two

Division Two featured eight clubs which competed in the previous season, along with six new clubs, relegated from Division One:
Hatfield Main
Heeley Amateurs
Kiveton Park
Norton Woodseats
Swallownest Miners Welfare
Thackley

League table

Map

Division Three

The division was formed by nine clubs relegated from Division Two and six new clubs.
Clubs relegated from Division Two:
Firth Vickers
Guiseley
Hall Road Rangers
Harrogate Railway Athletic
Harrogate Town
Leeds Ashley Road
Ossett Town
Sheffield
Stocksbridge Works
Plus:
Bradford Park Avenue reserves
Brook Sports
International Harvesters, joined from the Doncaster & District Senior League
Leeds & Carnegie College, new club
Sheffield Waterworks, joined from the Sheffield Association League
St. John's College (York)

League table

Map

League Cup

Final

References

1970–71 in English football leagues
Yorkshire Football League